"The Saddest Song" is a song by The Ataris. Described as a ballad, this song was released as the third and final single from their fourth album, So Long, Astoria. It reached #27 on the US Modern Rock Tracks.

This song was written by singer Kris Roe about being away from his daughter, Starla. He also cites his own broken childhood.

The accompanying music video shows the band playing in an abandoned house with a little girl trying to find them.

Chart performance
"The Saddest Song" peaked at number 27 on the US Modern Rock chart.

References

The Ataris songs
2003 singles
2002 songs
2000s ballads
Rock ballads
Columbia Records singles
Songs about childhood
Songs about parenthood